Aberdeen Burghs was a district of burghs constituency which was represented from 1708 to 1800 in the House of Commons of the Parliament of Great Britain, and from 1801 to 1832 in the House of Commons of the Parliament of the United Kingdom.

Creation
The British parliamentary constituency was created in 1708 following the Acts of Union 1707 and replaced the former Parliament of Scotland burgh constituencies of Aberdeen, Arbroath, Brechin, Inverbervie and Montrose.

Boundaries
The constituency consisted of the burgh of Aberdeen in the County of Aberdeen, the burgh of Inverbervie in the County of Kincardine, and the burghs of Arbroath, Brechin and Montrose in the County of Forfar.

History
The constituency returned one Member of Parliament (MP) by the first past the post system until the seat was abolished for the 1832 general election.

In 1832 the constituency was divided between the new constituencies of Aberdeen and Montrose Burghs. The Aberdeen constituency covered the burgh of Aberdeen, while Montrose Burghs covered the other burghs plus the burgh of Forfar, which was previously a component of the Perth Burghs constituency.

Members of Parliament

Elections

Elections in the 1700s

Elections in the 1710s

Elections in the 1720s

Elections in the 1730s

Elections in the 1740s

Elections in the 1750s

Elections in the 1760s

Elections in the 1770s

Elections in the 1780s

Elections in the 1790s

Elections in the 1800s

Elections in the 1810s

Elections in the 1820s

Elections in the 1830s

References

Historic parliamentary constituencies in Scotland (Westminster)
Politics of the county of Aberdeen
Politics of the county of Forfar
Politics of the county of Kincardine
Constituencies of the Parliament of the United Kingdom established in 1708
Constituencies of the Parliament of the United Kingdom disestablished in 1832
Politics of Aberdeen